The 2022 FIVB Volleyball Men's Nations League was the fourth edition of the FIVB Volleyball Men's Nations League, an annual men's international volleyball tournament. The competition was held between 7 June to 24 July 2022, and the final round took place in Unipol Arena, Bologna, Italy.

Australia were the last placed challenger team after the preliminary round and will be replaced by 2022 Challenger Cup winners Cuba in the 2023 edition.

France won their first VNL title after defeating the United States in five sets. It was the United States' second silver medal. Poland won their second bronze medal by sweeping the finals host Italy in straight sets. Earvin N'Gapeth from France was named the MVP of the tournament.

Qualification 
As there was no promotion or relegation in the 2021 VNL, 16 of the same 16 teams in 2021 are competing in this year's edition.

On 1 March 2022, FIVB declared Russia and Belarus not eligible for international and continental competitions due to Russia's invasion of Ukraine. As a result, Russia was out of the competition. On April 29, FIVB announced China replaced Russia for the competition.

Format

Preliminary round 
In the 2022 tournament, the format of play was changed. The new format will see 16 men's teams competing in pools of 8 teams during the pool phase. Each team plays 12 matches during the pool stage. Eight teams will then move into the final knockout phase of the competition.

Final round 
The VNL Finals will see the seven strongest teams along with the finals host country Italy moving directly to the knockout phase which will consist of eight matches in total: four quarterfinals, two semi-finals and the bronze and gold medal matches.

Final 8 direct elimination formula:

 The 1st ranked team will play a quarterfinal match against the 8th ranked team, the 2nd ranked team will play a quarterfinal match against the 7th ranked team, the 3rd ranked team will play a quarterfinal match against the 6th ranked team, the 4th ranked team will play a quarterfinal match against the 5th ranked team.
 The Host Team is placed in 1st position if the team is among the top 8 teams in the Final Standings after the VNL Preliminary Phase.
 The Host Team is placed in 8th position if the team is not among the top 8 teams in the Final Standings after the VNL Preliminary Phase.

Rule changes 
 Court switch at the end of the sets to be eliminated due to COVID-19 safety guidelines and for a better television broadcasts.
 Each team is allowed to call only one time-out during each set in the preliminary. The time-out lasts 30 seconds long.
 Only one technical time-out is made when the leading team reaches 12 points.
 Two time-outs per set are given to all matches in the Finals, one of them can only be called before technical time-out.
 Live interview is introduced into matches during Set 2 and Set 3 in the Finals. Therefore, the breaks between Set 2 and Set 3 will extend to 5 minutes.

Pool composition 
The overview of pools was released on 7 December 2021.

Venues

Preliminary round

Final round

Competition schedule

Pool standing procedure 
 Total number of victories (matches won, matches lost)
 In the event of a tie, the following first tiebreaker will apply: The teams will be ranked by the most points gained per match as follows:
Match won 3–0 or 3–1: 3 points for the winner, 0 points for the loser
Match won 3–2: 2 points for the winner, 1 point for the loser
Match forfeited: 3 points for the winner, 0 points (0–25, 0–25, 0–25) for the loser
 If teams are still tied after examining the number of victories and points gained, then the FIVB will examine the results in order to break the tie in the following order:
Sets quotient: if two or more teams are tied on the number of points gained, they will be ranked by the quotient resulting from the division of the number of all sets won by the number of all sets lost.
Points quotient: if the tie persists based on the sets quotient, the teams will be ranked by the quotient resulting from the division of all points scored by the total of points lost during all sets.
If the tie persists based on the points quotient, the tie will be broken based on the team that won the match of the Round Robin Phase between the tied teams. When the tie in points quotient is between three or more teams, these teams ranked taking into consideration only the matches involving the teams in question.

Squads

Preliminary round

Ranking 

|}
Source: VNL 2022 standings

Week 1

Pool 1 
All times are Brasília time (UTC−03:00).
|}

Pool 2 
All times are Eastern Daylight Time (UTC−04:00).
|}

Week 2

Pool 3 
All times are Philippine Standard Time (UTC+08:00).
|}

Pool 4 
All times are Eastern European Summer Time (UTC+03:00).
|}

Week 3

Pool 5 
All times are Japan Standard Time (UTC+09:00).
|}

Pool 6 
All times are Central European Summer Time (UTC+02:00).
|}

Final round 
All times are Central European Summer Time (UTC+02:00).

Quarterfinals 
|}

Semifinals 
|}

3rd place match 
|}

Final 
|}

Final standing 

Source: VNL 2022 final standings

Awards 

Most Valuable Player

Best Setter

Best Outside Spikers

Best Middle Blockers

Best Opposite Spiker

Best Libero

Statistics leaders

Preliminary round 
Statistics leaders correct as of Week 3 of preliminary round.

Final round 
Statistics leaders correct as of final round.

Controversies at the Finals 
Athletes and organizations complained about the organization of the Finals including poor facilities of training halls, transportation arrangements and meals arrangement. FIVB later apologized for the incidents and arranged a meeting with national teams’ captains.

See also 
2022 FIVB Volleyball Women's Nations League
2022 FIVB Volleyball Men's Challenger Cup
2022 FIVB Volleyball Women's Challenger Cup
2022 FIVB Volleyball Men's World Championship

Notes 
A.China forfeited the match on 22 June giving France a 3–0 win due to medical circumstances related to COVID-19.
B.Germany forfeited the match on 23 June giving China a 3–0 win because they refused to play against China even though the Chinese athletes were cleared by local authorities after testing positive for COVID-19.

References

External links 
Fédération Internationale de Volleyball – official website
FIVB Volleyball Nations League 2022 – official website

2022
2022 in volleyball
FIVB
FIVB
FIVB
FIVB
International men's volleyball competitions hosted by Italy
Sports events affected by the 2022 Russian invasion of Ukraine
July 2022 sports events in Canada
July 2022 sports events in Japan
July 2022 sports events in Poland
June 2022 sports events in Brazil
June 2022 sports events in Asia
Sport in Quezon City
Sport in Bologna
Sports competitions in Brasília
Sports competitions in Ottawa
Sports competitions in Sofia
Sports competitions in Osaka
Sports competitions in Gdańsk